Cnemidophorus cryptus, the cryptic racerunner, is a species of teiid lizard found in Venezuela, Brazil, Suriname, and French Guiana.

References

cryptus
Reptiles described in 1993
Taxa named by Charles J. Cole
Taxa named by Herbert C. Dessauer